The Radford family are a British family who first appeared on the 2012 Channel 4 documentary television programme 15 Kids and Counting. Subsequent annual updates focused on the last year in the Radford household. The last programme, 22 Kids and Counting, started airing on 9 January 2023 on Channel 5.

Family
Noel and Sue were both adopted as babies and met as children, then had their first child, Christopher, when Sue was 14 and Noel was 18. They then got married when Sue was 17 and Noel was 21. The family now lives in a former care home in Morecambe.
The family owns and operates Radford's Pie Company, also known as Faraday's, a bakery in Heysham, which they acquired in 1999.

The 2018 programme 20 Kids and Counting covered Sue and Noel's 25th wedding anniversary and the birth of their 20th child.
 
As of 2021, Sue and Noel have 22 children.

References

External links
 Radford's Pie Company official website

British families

Bakeries of the United Kingdom
Television series about families
People from Morecambe